Tulsishyam is located on the border of Amareli, Junagadh district and Gir Somnath district, in the Gir National Park in Gujarat state of India. It reachable by road 45 km from Dhari in Amreli district and 35 km from Una in Gir Somnath district..

Gravity hill 

Tulsishyam Anti Gravity Hill is a gravity hill where vehicles seems to defy the gravity and roll uphill.

Vishnu Shyam temple
There is an ancient temple of Lord Vishnu-Lord Shyam. Legend says that Lord Krishna eliminated the demon called Tul and so the place is associated with his name along with that of Krishna as Shyam and is thus called Tulsishyam. The idol of Lord Tulsishyam  is said to be 3000 years old. It is made up of black stone. There is a hot sulphur spring near the temple that is believed to have curative powers.

References

External links 
 TulsiShyam Mandir

Villages in Junagadh district